Alan Pennington (4 April 1916 – 2 June 1961) was a British sprinter. He competed in the men's 100 metres at the 1936 Summer Olympics. 

He served in World War II reaching the rank of Captain. He committed suicide in a hotel room in Lisbon.

References

External links
 

1916 births
1961 suicides
Athletes (track and field) at the 1936 Summer Olympics
British male sprinters
Olympic athletes of Great Britain
People from Wallasey
Suicides by firearm in Portugal
British military personnel of World War II